Loud Rocks is a blended album of remixes, covers and collaborations between heavy rock and hip hop artists performing songs of the latter. It was released by Loud Records in four editions: one with explicit lyrics, a clean version, a Japanese and a Canadian version (each including a bonus track).

Reception

Select gave the album a two out of five rating. The review compared the album to the Judgement Night Soundtrack stating that it "did much the same thing, but it found room for curious hybrids like Teenage Fanclub and De La Soul. Only Everlast and Mobb Deep's 'Shook Ones'...shows anything like the same ambition here."

Track listing

Charts

References

Rap rock compilation albums
2000 compilation albums